Krylovsky (masculine), Krylovskaya (feminine), or Krylovskoye (neuter) is the name of several rural localities in Russia:
Krylovsky, Bolkhovsky District, Oryol Oblast, a settlement in Yamskoy Selsoviet of Bolkhovsky District of Oryol Oblast
Krylovsky, Dmitrovsky District, Oryol Oblast, a settlement in Druzhensky Selsoviet of Dmitrovsky District of Oryol Oblast
Krylovsky, Volgograd Oblast, a khutor in Mirny Selsoviet of Novonikolayevsky District of Volgograd Oblast
Krylovskaya, Arkhangelsk Oblast, a village in Minsky Selsoviet of Ustyansky District of Arkhangelsk Oblast
Krylovskaya, Krylovsky District, Krasnodar Krai, a stanitsa in Krylovsky Rural Okrug of Krylovsky District of Krasnodar Krai
Krylovskaya, Leningradsky District, Krasnodar Krai, a stanitsa in Krylovsky Rural Okrug of Leningradsky District of Krasnodar Krai
Krylovskaya, Vologda Oblast, a village in Klimushinsky Selsoviet of Verkhovazhsky District of Vologda Oblast